Bergen Technical Museum is a technical museum located at Møhlenpris in Bergen, Norway. It is owned and run by various local membership groups with each their own specialized collections, which is collectively displayed in an old tram depot.

The museum is the starting place and acts as a depot for Bergen's Electric Tramway, which runs a heritage tramway service. The collections also include the two old funicular cars from Fløibanen and one of four preserved NSB Di 2 locomotives.

References

External links
 Official website

Museums in Bergen
Railway museums in Norway
Museums established in 1990
1990 establishments in Norway
Technology museums in Norway